This is a list of accredited and non-accredited higher academic institutions based in Albania.

Public institutions

Private institutions

Closed institutions

Other institutions 
 Quality Assurance Agency of Higher Education
 Academy of Sciences of Albania
 Centre for Research and Development on Information Technology and Telecommunication (Albania)
 Vëllezërit Kajtazi Educational Institute

See also
 Education in Albania
 Lists of universities and colleges by country
 List of libraries in Albania
 List of schools in Albania

References 

 
Universities
Albania
Albania